The Otis Bridge is a six-lane girder bridge crossing the Estero de Concordia, a tributary of the Pasig River, in Manila, the Philippines. Built in 1968 and carrying Paz Mendoza Guazon Street, formerly known as Otis Street, the bridge is a major artery for commercial vehicles carrying cargo from the Port of Manila, with some 10,000 trucks crossing the bridge daily.

In 2015, the bridge was slated for replacement or reconstruction as it neared the end of its 50-year service life, with  initially being allocated for construction work by the Department of Public Works and Highways (DPWH).

The bridge was reopened on December 4, 2018, three months ahead of the March 2019 target date, with  being allocated from the national budget for its replacement. Construction took place 24/7 in phases until the project was completed.

References

Bridges in Manila
Girder bridges
Buildings and structures in Paco, Manila
Bridges completed in 1968